The Tanganyika African National Union (TANU) was the principal political party in the struggle for sovereignty in the East African state of Tanganyika (now Tanzania). The party was formed from the Tanganyika African Association by Julius Nyerere in July 1954 when he was teaching at St. Francis' College (which is now known as Pugu High School). From 1964 the party was called the Tanzania African National Union. In January 1977 the TANU merged with the ruling party in Zanzibar, the Afro-Shirazi Party (ASP), to form the current Revolutionary State Party or Chama Cha Mapinduzi (CCM).  The policy of TANU was to build and maintain a socialist state aiming towards economic self-sufficiency and to eradicate corruption and exploitation, with the major means of production and exchange under the control of the peasants and workers (Ujamaa-Essays on Socialism; "The Arusha Declaration").

Julius Nyerere was the first President of Tanzania, serving from the 1960s to 1985. In 1962, Nyerere and TANU created the Ministry of National Culture and Youth.  Nyerere felt the creation of the ministry was necessary in order to deal with some of the challenges and contradictions of building a nation-state and a national culture after 70 years of colonialism.  The government of Tanzania sought to create an innovative public space where Tanzanian popular culture could develop and flourish.  By incorporating the varied traditions and customs of all peoples of Tanzania, Nyerere hoped to promote a sense of pride, thus creating a national culture.

Electoral history

Presidential elections

Bunge elections

Note 
In the 1958–59 TANU won all seats the remaining 34 seats were appointed

The Afro Shirazi party was the sole legal party in Zanzibar which is an autonomous region

References

External links
 http://www.tanserve.com/facts/index_files/history.htm

1954 establishments in Tanganyika
Defunct political parties in Tanzania
Parties of one-party systems
Political movements in Tanzania
Political parties established in 1954
Political parties disestablished in 1977
Politics of Tanganyika
Tanganyika (territory)
African and Black nationalist organizations in Africa
African socialist political parties
Chama Cha Mapinduzi
Socialist parties in Tanzania